Leinster is a town in the northern Goldfields area of Western Australia.

The town was established in 1976 by Agnew Mining, initially as a dormitory town for miners working in the nearby Perseverance and Rockys Reward nickel mines, now the Leinster Nickel Mine, and Agnew gold mines, now the Agnew Gold Mine. It was named for the nearby Leinster Downs station. Facilities at Leinster include a supermarket, service station, community school, day care centre, medical centre and tavern. Sporting facilities include an indoor sports centre, a  Olympic sized pool and a baby pool, squash courts, BMX track, football and cricket oval, and an 18-hole golf course. The school is an independent public school for students up to year 12.

The Leinster Nickel Operation is part of the BHP's Nickel West business group. As at 2006, the operation employed 992 workers and produced  of nickel in concentrate per year. Leinster Airport was built adjacent to the mine.

References

Mining towns in Western Australia
Company towns in Australia
Towns in Western Australia
Shire of Leonora